Q with stroke (Ꝗ, ꝗ) is a letter of the Latin alphabet, derived from writing the letter Q with the addition of a bar through the letter's descender. The letter was used by scribes during the Middle Ages, where it was employed primarily as an abbreviationa modern parallel of this would be abbreviating the word "and" with an ampersand (&). The letter was also used to write some modern languages. Between 1928 and 1938, the Lezgin alphabets and Dargin writing had used Ꝗ, but since 1938, both corresponding languages are written with Cyrillic-based alphabets, using the digraph Кь in place of Ꝗ.

When used to write the Latin language, ꝗ could be used alone or as part of a word. Alone, it stood for quam; as part of a word, it stood for either quan- (as in ꝗdo for quando) or qui- (as in ꝗlꝫ for quilibet). In the French language, ꝗ was used as an abbreviation for the word que; in Irish, it abbreviated ar. Closely related is the letter Q with diagonal stroke (Ꝙ, ꝙ), which stood alone to abbreviate quod, qui and que in Latin. In Portuguese, ꝙ also abbreviated quem.

Computer encoding
Ꝗ and Ꝙ, along with other letters of interest to scholars of medieval manuscripts, was added to the Unicode Standard in 2006 after a request by Michael Everson. It resides in the Latin Extended-D block of the Basic Multilingual Plane.

References

Phonetic transcription symbols
Latin letters with diacritics